Robert William Peck is Canada's former Ambassador Extraordinary and Plenipotentiary to Algeria. He is serving as Canada's chief of protocol.

Biography 
August 9, 2004 he appointed Canada's Ambassador to the People’s Democratic Republic of Algeria, where he served until October 2007.

From October 2007 to December 2010 he was Chief of Protocol of Canada Foreign Affairs and International Trade Canada.

From October 2011 to October 2015 he served Ambassador of Canada to the Hellenic Republic and High Commissioner to the Republic of Cyprus Foreign Affairs, Trade and Development Canada.

Since November 2015  he served Senior Advisor, EX Career Transition & former Head of Mission/mentor in residence Global Affairs Canada.

References

Year of birth missing (living people)
Living people
Place of birth missing (living people)
Ambassadors of Canada to Algeria
Ambassadors of Canada to Greece